Mikadotrochus salmianus, common name the Salmiana slit shell, is a species of large sea snail, a marine gastropod mollusk in the family Pleurotomariidae, the slit snails.

Subspecies
 Mikadotrochus salmianus neocaledonicus Anseeuw, 2016
 Mikadotrochus salmianus salmianus (Rolle, 1899)

Description
The shell is broadly trochiform, almost conical in shape. The shell is  false umbilicus and spirally twisted on all sides. The shell is off-white in color with blazed red spirals. It is almost exactly conical with a broken or flattened tip. It is surrounded on all sides with furrows or traces of growth.

Distribution
This species occurs in the Pacific Ocean off Japan, Fiji Islands and the Philippines.

References

External links
 Mikadotrochus salmianus in the USNM Invertebrate Zoology Mollusca Collection
 Mikadotrochus salmiana in the USNM Invertebrate Zoology Mollusca Collection
 

Pleurotomariidae
Gastropods described in 1899